Odoben  is a town located at Asikuma Odoben Brakwa district in the  Central Region of Ghana. The town is known for the Odoben Senior High School.  The school is a second cycle institution.

References

Populated places in the Central Region (Ghana)